Zoltán Fodor (born 29 July 1985 in Budapest) is a Hungarian Greco-Roman wrestler, who won a silver medal at the 2008 Summer Olympics in the 84 kg weight division.

External links
 Beijing 2008 Profile

1985 births
Living people
Sport wrestlers from Budapest
Olympic silver medalists for Hungary
Olympic wrestlers of Hungary
Wrestlers at the 2008 Summer Olympics
Olympic medalists in wrestling
Medalists at the 2008 Summer Olympics
Hungarian male sport wrestlers
21st-century Hungarian people